Geoffrey Hare Clayton was an Anglican bishop in the 20th century.

He was born on 12 December 1884, educated at Rugby and Pembroke College, Cambridge, and ordained, after a period of study at Ripon College Cuddesdon, in 1909. A Fellow of Peterhouse, Cambridge, he was its Dean from 1910 to 1914 when he became a Chaplain to the BEF. When peace returned he was vicar of Little St Mary's, Cambridge and after that (successively) vicar, rural dean and finally archdeacon of Chesterfield. In 1934 he became bishop of Johannesburg and served for 14 years before his appointment as archbishop of Cape Town. A sub-prelate of the Order of St John of Jerusalem, he died on 7 March 1957.

Apartheid and the Archbishop
On Ash Wednesday 1957, the day before he died, Clayton signed, on behalf of the bishops of the Church of the Province of South Africa, a letter to the prime minister of South Africa, J.G. Strijdom refusing to obey and refusing to counsel the people of the Anglican Church in South Africa to obey, the provisions of section 29(c) of the Native Laws Amendment Act. The act sought to force apartheid in all Christian congregations.

Notes

External links
Wits Historical papers

1884 births
1957 deaths
People educated at Rugby School
Alumni of Pembroke College, Cambridge
Alumni of Ripon College Cuddesdon
Fellows of Peterhouse, Cambridge
Church of England deans
Archdeacons of Chesterfield
Anglican bishops of Johannesburg
20th-century Anglican Church of Southern Africa bishops
Anglican archbishops of Cape Town
20th-century Anglican archbishops
Sub-Prelates of the Venerable Order of Saint John
World War I chaplains
Royal Army Chaplains' Department officers